The Longo Maï Co-operatives are a network of agricultural co-operatives with an anti-capitalist ideological focus. Founded in 1973 in Limans, France, the network has spread in Europe and to Central America.

History

Following the events of May 68 groups of students from Austria and Switzerland who held anarchist ideologies collaborated to raise funds to allow them to buy land upon which to start to farm collectively. In 1973 they purchased 270 hectares of land at Limans near Forcalquier.

The communitie's ideological leader was Roland Perrot, a military deserter from the war in Algeria. Perrot knew Jean Giono and had experienced the free commune in Contadour in the 1930s. The ideological focus of the community is anti-militarist and pacifist, anti-capitalist and egalitarian.  Activities focus upon self-sufficiency, community life, craft and agricultural production, the joint management of energy, water and respect for the environment.

Longo Maï has been involved with various international solidarity efforts with a particular focus on resistance against dictatorships.

Facilities
The ten Longo Mai co-operatives operate in a network:

 In France:
 Limans
 Briançon, Saint-Chaffrey (Hautes-Alpes) which processes 12 to 15 tons of wool a year
 Mas de Granier, the village of Caphan at Saint-Martin-de-Crau (Bouches-du-Rhone);
 Treyne, Chanéac, Upper Ardèche (twenty adults and twelve children in 1999)
 Cabrery, wine and olive trees
 In other countries:
 Ulenkrug, Mecklenburg, Germany;
 Hof Stopar Eisenkappel in Carinthia, Austria (17 hectares plus 25 hectares leased, breeding sheep)
 Montois farm in the Swiss Jura (12 ha geese and sheep)
 Uzhgorod, Transcarpathia, Ukraine, with a French school in the 1990s
 Finca Sonador in Costa Rica

The head office of the cooperative is in Basel, from which are organised campaigns to collect donations (about five million francs a year in the 1990s).

The cooperative also has media operations

 Radio Free Radio Zinzine: Founded in 1981 and named after the hill in Limans on which the community was founded.  It is affiliated to the European Federation of Free Radio
 a news agency, l'Agence Indépendante d'information (AIM), which has a hundred contributing journalists
 le journal Archipel, Journal of the European Civic Forum
 It also publishes some books.

See also
 Coopératives Longo Maï - from Wikipedia France
 La coopérative Européenne Longo Mai de Limans

References

External links

 

Agricultural cooperatives
Agriculture in society
Cooperatives in Switzerland
Agriculture companies of France
Cooperatives in France
Companies based in Provence-Alpes-Côte d'Azur